Hydnocarpus hainanensis is a species of plant in the Achariaceae family. It is found in China and Vietnam. It is threatened by habitat loss.

References

hainanensis
Vulnerable plants
Taxonomy articles created by Polbot
Plants described in 1923